Fuzhu (Chinese: 夫诸) is a mythical beast in ancient Chinese myths and legends. It appears in the Shanhaijing.

Appearance
Fuzhu is described to be a kind of deer with four horns. It is described as being gentle and having a likeness to be clean. The Fuzhu usually appears during periods of flood.

References

Chinese legendary creatures